

Events

Pre-1600
 361 – Emperor Constantius II dies of a fever at Mopsuestia in Cilicia; on his deathbed he is baptised and declares his cousin Julian rightful successor.
1333 – The River Arno floods causing massive damage in Florence as recorded by the Florentine chronicler Giovanni Villani.
1468 – Liège is sacked by Charles I of Burgundy's troops.
1492 – Peace of Etaples between Henry VII of England and Charles VIII of France.
1493 – Christopher Columbus first sights the island of Dominica in the Caribbean Sea.
1534 – English Parliament passes the first Act of Supremacy, making King Henry VIII head of the Anglican Church, supplanting the pope and the  Roman Catholic Church.

1601–1900
1783 – The American Continental Army is disbanded.
1793 – French playwright, journalist and feminist Olympe de Gouges is guillotined.
1812 – Napoleon's armies are defeated at the Battle of Vyazma.
1817 – The Bank of Montreal, Canada's oldest chartered bank, opens in Montreal.
1838 – The Times of India, the world's largest circulated English language daily broadsheet newspaper is founded as The Bombay Times and Journal of Commerce.
1848 – A greatly revised Dutch constitution, which transfers much authority from the king to his parliament and ministers, is proclaimed.
1867 – Giuseppe Garibaldi and his followers are defeated in the Battle of Mentana and fail to end the Pope's Temporal power in Rome (it would be achieved three years later).
1868 – John Willis Menard (R-LA) was the first African American elected to the United States Congress.  Because of an electoral challenge, he was never seated.
1881 – The Mapuche uprising of 1881 begins in Chile.
1898 – France withdraws its troops from Fashoda (now in Sudan), ending the Fashoda Incident.

1901–present
1903 – With the encouragement of the United States, Panama separates from Colombia.
1908 – William Howard Taft is elected the 27th President of the United States.
1911 – Chevrolet officially enters the automobile market in competition with the Ford Model T.
1918 – The German Revolution of 1918–19 begins when 40,000 sailors take over the port in Kiel.
1920 – Russian Civil War: The Russian Army retreats to Crimea, after a successful offensive by the Red Army and Revolutionary Insurgent Army of Ukraine.
1929 – The Gwangju Student Independence Movement occurred.
1930 – Getúlio Vargas becomes Head of the Provisional Government in Brazil after a bloodless coup on October 24.
1932 – Panagis Tsaldaris becomes the 142nd Prime Minister of Greece.
1935 – George II of Greece regains his throne through a popular, though possibly fixed, plebiscite.
1936 – Franklin D. Roosevelt is elected the 32nd President of the United States.
1942 – World War II: The Koli Point action begins during the Guadalcanal Campaign and ends on November 12.
1943 – World War II: Five hundred aircraft of the U.S. 8th Air Force devastate Wilhelmshaven harbor in Germany.
1944 – World War II: Two supreme commanders of the Slovak National Uprising, Generals Ján Golian and Rudolf Viest, are captured, tortured and later executed by German forces.
1946 – The Constitution of Japan is adopted through Emperor's assent.
1949 – Chinese Civil War: The Battle of Dengbu Island occurs.
1950 – Air India Flight 245 crashes into Mont Blanc, while on approach to Geneva Airport, killing all 48 people on board.
1956 – Suez Crisis: The Khan Yunis killings by the Israel Defense Forces in Egyptian-controlled Gaza result in the deaths of 275 Palestinians.
  1956   – Hungarian Revolution: A new Hungarian government is formed, in which many members of banned non-Communist parties participate.  János Kádár and Ferenc Münnich form a counter-government in Moscow as Soviet troops prepare for the final assault.
1957 – Sputnik program: The Soviet Union launches Sputnik 2. On board is the first animal to enter orbit, a dog named Laika.
1960 – The land that would become the Great Swamp National Wildlife Refuge is established by an Act of Congress after a year-long legal battle that pitted local residents against Port Authority of New York and New Jersey officials wishing to turn the Great Swamp into a major regional airport for jet aircraft.
1961 – U Thant is unanimously appointed as the 3rd Secretary-General of the United Nations, becoming the first non-European individual to occupy the post.
1964 – Lyndon B. Johnson is elected to a full term as U.S. president, winning 61% of the vote and 44 states, while Washington D.C. residents are able to vote in a presidential election for the first time, casting the majority of their votes for Lyndon Johnson.
1967 – Vietnam War: The Battle of Dak To begins.
1969 – Vietnam War: U.S. President Richard M. Nixon addresses the nation on television and radio, asking the "silent majority" to join him in solidarity on the Vietnam War effort and to support his policies.
1973 – Mariner program: NASA launches the Mariner 10 toward Mercury. On March 29, 1974, it becomes the first space probe to reach that planet.
1975 – Syed Nazrul Islam, A. H. M. Qamaruzzaman, Tajuddin Ahmad, and Muhammad Mansur Ali, Bangladeshi politicians and Sheikh Mujibur Rahman loyalists, are murdered in the Dhaka Central Jail.
1978 – Dominica gains its independence from the United Kingdom.
1979 – Greensboro massacre: Five members of the Communist Workers Party are shot dead and seven are wounded by a group of Klansmen and neo-Nazis during a "Death to the Klan" rally in Greensboro, North Carolina, United States.
1982 – The Salang Tunnel fire in Afghanistan by kills 150–2000 people.
1986 – Iran–Contra affair: The Lebanese magazine Ash-Shiraa reports that the United States has been secretly selling weapons to Iran in order to secure the release of seven American hostages held by pro-Iranian groups in Lebanon.
  1986   – The Compact of Free Association becomes law, granting the Federated States of Micronesia and the Marshall Islands independence from the United States.
1988 – Sri Lankan Tamil mercenaries attempt to overthrow the Maldivian government. At President Maumoon Abdul Gayoom's request, the Indian military suppresses the rebellion within 24 hours.
1992 – Democratic Arkansas Governor Bill Clinton defeats Republican President George H. W. Bush and Independent candidate Ross Perot in the 1992 United States presidential election.
1996 – Abdullah Çatlı, the leader of the Turkish ultranationalist organization Grey Wolves, dies in the Susurluk car crash, leading to the resignation of Interior Minister Mehmet Ağar (a leader of the True Path Party).
1997 – The United States imposes economic sanctions against Sudan in response to its human rights abuses of its own citizens and its material and political assistance to Islamic extremist groups across the Middle East and East Africa.
2014 – One World Trade Center officially opens in New York City, replacing the Twin Towers after they were destroyed during the September 11 attacks.
2020 – The 2020 United States presidential election takes place between Democratic Joe Biden and Republican incumbent President Donald Trump. On November 7, Biden was declared the winner.

Births

Pre-1600
AD 39 – Lucan, Roman poet (d. 65)
1500 – Benvenuto Cellini, Italian sculptor and painter (d. 1571)
1505 – Achilles Gasser, German physician and astrologer (d. 1577)
1527 – Tilemann Heshusius, Gnesio-Lutheran theologian (d. 1588)
1560 – Annibale Carracci, Italian painter and illustrator (d. 1609)
1587 – Samuel Scheidt, German organist, composer, and educator (d. 1654)

1601–1900
1604 – Osman II, Ottoman sultan (d. 1622)
1618 – Aurangzeb, Mughal emperor of India (d. 1707)
1656 – Georg Reutter, Austrian organist and composer (d. 1738)
1659 – Hui-bin Jang, Royal consort (d. 1701)
1689 – Jan Josef Ignác Brentner, Czech composer (d. 1742)
1749 – Daniel Rutherford, Scottish chemist and physician (d. 1819)
1757 – Robert Smith, American soldier, lawyer, and politician, 6th United States Secretary of State (d. 1842)
1777 – Princess Sophia of the United Kingdom (d. 1848)
1793 – Stephen F. Austin, American businessman and politician (d. 1836)
1794 – William Cullen Bryant, American poet and journalist (d. 1878)
1799 – William Sprague III, American lawyer and politician, 14th Governor of Rhode Island (d. 1856)
1801 – Karl Baedeker, German author and publisher, founded the Baedeker Publishing Company (d. 1859)
  1801   – Vincenzo Bellini, Italian composer (d. 1835)
1815 – John Mitchel, Irish journalist and activist (d. 1875)
1816 – Jubal Early, American general and lawyer (d. 1894)
  1816   – Calvin Fairbank, American minister and activist (d. 1898)
1845 – Edward Douglass White, American lawyer, jurist, and politician, 9th Chief Justice of the United States (d. 1921)
1852 – Emperor Meiji of Japan (d. 1912)
1854 – Carlo Fornasini, Italian micropalaeontologist (d. 1931)
1856 – Jim McCormick, Scottish-American baseball player and manager (d. 1918)
1857 – Mikhail Alekseyev, Russian general (d. 1918)
1862 – Henry George, Jr., American journalist and politician (d. 1916)
1863 – Alfred Perot, French physicist and academic (d. 1925)
1866 – Harry Staley, American baseball player (d. 1910)
1871 – Albert Goldthorpe, English rugby player and manager (d. 1943)
1875 – Emīls Dārziņš, Latvian composer and conductor (d. 1910)
1876 – Stephen Alencastre, American bishop and missionary (d. 1940)
1877 – Carlos Ibáñez del Campo, Chilean general and politician, 20th President of Chile (d. 1960)
1878 – Bangalore Nagarathnamma, Indian Carnatic singer and activist (d. 1952)
1882 – Yakub Kolas, Belarusian writer (d. 1956)
1884 – Joseph William Martin, Jr., American publisher and politician, 49th Speaker of the United States House of Representatives (d. 1968)
1887 – Samuil Marshak, Russian author and poet (d. 1964)
1887 – Eileen Hendriks, British geologist (d. 1978)
1890 – Harry Stephen Keeler, American author (d. 1967)
  1890   – Eustáquio van Lieshout, Dutch-Brazilian priest and missionary (d. 1943)
1894 – William George Barker, Canadian pilot and colonel, Victoria Cross recipient (d. 1930)
  1894   – Sofoklis Venizelos, Greek captain and politician, 133rd Prime Minister of Greece (d. 1964)
1896 – Gustaf Tenggren, Swedish-American illustrator and animator (d. 1970)
1899 – Ralph Greenleaf, American billiards player (d. 1950)
  1899   – Rezső Seress, Hungarian pianist and composer (d. 1968)
  1899   – Gleb Wataghin, Ukrainian-Italian physicist and academic (d. 1986)
1900 – Adolf Dassler, German businessman, founded Adidas (d. 1978)

1901–present
1901 – Leopold III of Belgium (d. 1983)
  1901   – André Malraux, French historian, theorist, and author (d. 1976)
  1901   – Lionel Hitchman, Canadian ice hockey player (d. 1969)
1903 – Walker Evans, American photographer and journalist (d. 1975)
1905 – Lois Mailou Jones, American painter and academic (d. 1998)
1906 – Julia Boyer Reinstein, American teacher and historian (d. 1998)
1908 – Giovanni Leone, Italian lawyer and politician, 6th President of Italy (d. 2001)
  1908   – Bronko Nagurski, Canadian-American football player, wrestler, and coach (d. 1990)
1909 – James Reston, Scottish-American journalist and author (d. 1995)
1910 – Karel Zeman, Czech director, animator, production designer, and screenwriter (d. 1989)
1911 – Kick Smit, Dutch footballer and manager (d. 1974)
1912 – Alfredo Stroessner, Paraguayan general and politician, 46th President of Paraguay (d. 2006)
1915 – Hal Jackson, American journalist and radio host (d. 2012)
1917 – Annapurna Maharana, Indian activist (d. 2012)
1918 – Claude Barma, French director, producer, and screenwriter (d. 1992)
  1918   – Bob Feller, American sailor, baseball player, and sportscaster (d. 2010)
  1918   – Elizabeth P. Hoisington, American general (d. 2007)
  1918   – Russell B. Long, American lieutenant, lawyer, and politician (d. 2003)
1919 – Jesús Blasco, Spanish author and illustrator (d. 1995)
  1919   – Ludovic Kennedy, Scottish journalist and author (d. 2009)
  1919   – Květa Legátová, Czech author (d. 2012)
1920 – Oodgeroo Noonuccal, Australian poet, educator, and activist (d. 1993)
1921 – Charles Bronson, American soldier and actor (d. 2003)
1922 – Dennis McDermott, English-Canadian union leader and diplomat, Canadian Ambassador to Ireland (d. 2003)
1923 – Violetta Elvin, Russian ballerina (d. 2021)
  1923   – Tomás Ó Fiaich, Irish cardinal (d. 1990)
  1923   – Yamaguchi Hitomi, Japanese author and critic (d. 1995)
1924 – Marc Breaux, American actor, director, and choreographer (d. 2013)
  1924   – Samuel Ruiz, Mexican bishop (d. 2011)
1926 – Valdas Adamkus, Lithuanian engineer and politician, 3rd President of Lithuania
  1926   – Maurice Couture, Canadian archbishop (d. 2018)
  1926   – Robert W. Wilson, American businessman and philanthropist (d. 2013)
1927 – Harrison McCain, Canadian businessman, co-founded McCain Foods (d. 2004)
  1927   – Peggy McCay, American actress (d. 2018)
  1927   – Odvar Nordli, Norwegian politician, 21st Prime Minister of Norway (d. 2018)
1928 – Goseki Kojima, Japanese illustrator (d. 2000)
  1928   – Bill Morrison, Australian politician and diplomat, 37th Australian Minister for Defence (d. 2013)
  1928   – Osamu Tezuka, Japanese animator and producer (d. 1989)
  1928   – George Yardley, American basketball player (d. 2004)
1929 – Alfonso Orueta, Chilean footballer, manager, and politician (d. 2012)
1930 – Phil Crane, American academic and politician (d. 2014)
  1930   – William H. Dana, American engineer, pilot, and astronaut (d. 2014)
  1930   – Mable John, American blues singer (d. 2022)
  1930   – D. James Kennedy, American pastor and author (d. 2007)
  1930   – Brian Robinson, English cyclist (d. 2022)
  1930   – Tsutomu Seki, Japanese astronomer and academic
  1930   – Lois Smith, American actress
  1930   – Frits Staal, Dutch philosopher and scholar (d. 2012)
1931 – Yon Hyong-muk, North Korean soldier and politician, 7th Premier of North Korea (d. 2005)
  1931   – Monica Vitti, Italian actress, singer, and screenwriter (d. 2022)
  1931   – Michael Fu Tieshan, Chinese bishop (d. 2007)
1932 – Albert Reynolds, Irish businessman and politician, 9th Taoiseach of Ireland (d. 2014)
  1932   – Gerry Ehman, Canadian ice hockey player (d. 2006)
1933 – John Barry, English-American composer and conductor (d. 2011)
  1933   – Ken Berry, American actor, singer, and dancer (d. 2018)
  1933   – Jeremy Brett, English actor (d. 1995)
  1933   – Aneta Corsaut, American actress (d. 1995)
  1933   – Michael Dukakis, American lawyer, academic, and politician, 65th Governor of Massachusetts
  1933   – Amartya Sen, Indian economist and academic, Nobel Prize laureate
1934 – Kenneth Baker, Baron Baker of Dorking, English poet and politician, Chancellor of the Duchy of Lancaster
  1934   – Hans Janmaat, Dutch businessman, educator, and politician (d. 2002)
1935 – Ingrid Rüütel, Estonian philologist and academic, 3rd First Lady of Estonia
1936 – Roy Emerson, Australian-American tennis player and coach
  1936   – Takao Saito, Japanese author and illustrator, created Golgo 13 (d. 2021)
1937 – Dietrich Möller, German lawyer and politician, 15th Mayor of Marburg
  1937   – Jim Houston, American football player (d. 2018)
1938 – Martin Dunwoody, English mathematician and academic
  1938   – Akira Kobayashi, Japanese actor
  1938   – Jean Rollin, French actor, director, and screenwriter (d. 2010)
1940 – Sonny Rhodes, American singer-songwriter and guitarist (d. 2021)
1942 – Martin Cruz Smith, American author and screenwriter
1943 – Bert Jansch, Scottish-English singer-songwriter and guitarist (d. 2011)
1944 – Jan Boerstoel, Dutch poet and songwriter
1945 – Ken Holtzman, American baseball player and manager
  1945   – Gerd Müller, German footballer and manager (d. 2021)
  1945   – Nick Simper, English bass guitarist
1946 – Reinhard Karl, German mountaineer, photographer, and author (d. 1982)
  1946   – Wataru Takeshita, Japanese lawyer and politician (d. 2021)
1947 – Mazie Hirono, Japanese-American lawyer and politician, U.S. Senator from Hawaii
  1947   – Siiri Oviir, Estonian lawyer and politician, 3rd Estonian Minister of Social Affairs
  1947   – Faraj Sarkohi, Iranian journalist and critic
1948 – Lulu, Scottish singer-songwriter and actress
  1948   – Takashi Kawamura, Japanese politician
  1948   – Helmuth Koinigg, Austrian race car driver (d. 1974)
  1948   – Rick Kreuger, American baseball player and coach
  1948   – Rainer Zobel, German footballer, coach, and manager
1949 – Mike Evans, American actor and screenwriter (d. 2006)
  1949   – Osamu Fujimura, Japanese engineer and  politician
  1949   – Stephen Oliver, English biochemist and academic
  1949   – Larry Holmes, American boxer and talk show host
  1949   – Anna Wintour, English-American journalist
1950 – Massimo Mongai, Italian journalist and author (d. 2016)
  1950   – Joe Queenan, American author and critic
1951 – Dwight Evans, American baseball player and coach
  1951   – Ed Murawinski, American cartoonist
  1951   – André Wetzel, Dutch footballer and manager
1952 – Roseanne Barr, American comedian, actress, and producer
  1952   – Jim Cummings, American voice actor
  1952   – David Ho, Taiwanese-American scientist
1953 – Kate Capshaw, American actress and producer
  1953   – Helios Creed, American singer-songwriter and guitarist
  1953   – Larry Herndon, American baseball player and coach
  1953   – Dennis Miller, American comedian, producer, and talk show host
  1953   – Vilma Santos, Filipino actress and politician
1954 – Adam Ant, English singer-songwriter and actor
  1954   – Kathy Kinney, American actress and comedian
1955 – Teresa De Sio, Italian singer-songwriter and guitarist
  1955   – Anne Milton, English nurse and politician
  1955   – Phil Simms, American football player and sportscaster
1956 – Cathy Jamieson, Scottish politician, 2nd Scottish Minister for Justice
  1956   – Kevin Murphy, American actor, puppeteer, producer, and screenwriter
  1956   – Gary Ross, American director, producer, and screenwriter
  1956   – Bob Welch, American baseball player and coach (d. 2014)
1957 – Dolph Lundgren, Swedish actor, director, producer, screenwriter, and martial artist
  1957   – Gary Olsen, English actor (d. 2000)
  1957   – Steve Johnson, American basketball player
1958 – Brady Hoke, American football coach
1959 – Hal Hartley, American director, producer, and screenwriter
1960 – Karch Kiraly, American volleyball player, coach, and sportscaster
  1960   – Ian McNabb, English singer-songwriter and musician
1961 – David Armstrong-Jones, 2nd Earl of Snowdon, English businessman
  1961   – Dave Hahn, Japanese-American mountaineer and journalist
  1961   – Greg Townsend, American football player
1962 – Gabe Newell, American businessman, co-founded Valve
  1962   – David J. Schiappa, American lawyer and politician
  1962   – Jacqui Smith, English lawyer and politician
1963 – Davis Guggenheim, American director, producer, and screenwriter
  1963   – Shigeaki Hattori, Japanese race car driver
  1963   – Ian Wright, English footballer, manager, and sportscaster
  1963   – Howard Ballard, American football player
1964 – Algimantas Briaunis, Lithuanian footballer and manager
  1964   – Bryan Young, New Zealand cricketer
1965 – Gert Heerkes, Dutch footballer and manager
  1965   – Ann Scott, French-English author
  1965   – Mike Springer, American golfer
1967 – Mike O'Neill, Canadian ice hockey player
  1967   – Mark Roberts, Welsh singer and guitarist
  1967   – Steven Wilson, English singer-songwriter, guitarist, and producer
1968 – Alberto Iñurrategi, Spanish mountaineer
  1968   – Paul Quantrill, Canadian baseball player and coach
1969 – Robert Miles, Swiss-Italian DJ and producer (d. 2017)
  1969   – Niels van Steenis, Dutch rower
1970 – Geir Frigård, Norwegian footballer
  1970   – Jeanette J. Epps, American aerospace engineer and astronaut
  1970   – Doug Zmolek, American ice hockey player
1971 – Diego Alessi, Italian race car driver
  1971   – Unai Emery, Spanish football manager and former player
  1971   – Dylan Moran, Irish actor, comedian, and screenwriter
  1971   – Alison Williamson, English archer
  1971   – Dwight Yorke, Tobagonian footballer and coach
1972 – Ugo Ehiogu, English footballer and manager (d. 2017)
  1972   – Michael Hofmann, German footballer
  1972   – Marko Koers, Dutch runner
  1972   – Armando Benitez, Dominican baseball player
1973 – Ben Fogle, English television host and author
  1973   – Sticky Fingaz, American rapper, producer, and actor
  1973   – Christian Picciolini, American businessman and manager
  1973   – Chrissie Swan, Australian radio and television host
  1973   – Mick Thomson, American guitarist
1974 – Tariq Abdul-Wahad, French basketball player and coach
1975 – Darren Sharper, American football player and sportscaster
1976 – Guillermo Franco, Argentinian-Mexican footballer
  1976   – Jake Shimabukuro, American ukulele player and composer
1977 – Marcel Ketelaer, German footballer
  1977   – Greg Plitt, American model and actor (d. 2015)
  1977   – Damien Woody, American football player
1978 – Tim McIlrath, American singer-songwriter and guitarist
  1978   – Jonas Howden Sjøvaag, Norwegian drummer
  1978   – Hiroko Sakai, Japanese softball player
1979 – Pablo Aimar, Argentinian footballer
  1979   – Beau McDonald, Australian footballer and coach
1980 – Hans Andersen, Danish motorcycle racer
1981 – Diego López, Spanish footballer
  1981   – Vicente Matías Vuoso, Argentinian-Mexican footballer
  1981   – Rodrigo Millar, Chilean footballer
  1981   – Sten Pentus, Estonian race car driver
  1981   – Karlos Dansby, American football player
1982 – Moniek Kleinsman, Dutch speed skater
  1982   – Evgeni Plushenko, Russian figure skater
  1982   – Egemen Korkmaz, Turkish footballer
  1982   – Janel McCarville, American professional basketball player
  1982   – Jay Harrison, Canadian ice hockey player
  1982   – Pekka Rinne, Finnish ice hockey player
1983 – Myrna Braza, Norwegian singer-songwriter
  1983   – Tamba Hali, American football player
1984 – Christian Bakkerud, Danish race car driver (d. 2011)
  1984   – Ryo Nishikido, Japanese singer-songwriter and actor
  1984   – LaMarr Woodley, American football player
1985 – Tyler Hansbrough, American basketball player
  1985   – Philipp Tschauner, German footballer
1986 – Paul Derbyshire, Italian rugby player
  1986   – Davon Jefferson, American  basketball player
  1986   – Piet Velthuizen, Dutch footballer
  1986   – Heo Young-saeng, South Korean singer
1987 – Courtney Barnett, Australian singer-songwriter and guitarist
  1987   – Colin Kaepernick, American football player
  1987   – Ty Lawson, American basketball player
  1987   – Felix Schütz, German ice hockey player
  1987   – Gemma Ward, Australian model and actress
  1987   – Kyle Seager, American baseball player
1988 – Jessie Loutit, Canadian rower
1989 – Paula DeAnda, American singer-songwriter and actress
  1989   – Joyce Jonathan, French singer-songwriter and guitarist
1990 – Ellyse Perry, Australian footballer and cricketer
1991 – Damisha Croney, Barbadian netball player
1992 – Joe Clarke, English slalom canoeist
  1992   – Valeria Solovyeva, Russian tennis player
1993 – Kenny Golladay, American football player
  1993   – Martina Trevisan, Italian tennis player
1995 – Kendall Jenner, American television personality and model
1997 – Kyle Benjamin, American race car driver
  1997   – Connor McGovern, American football player
  1997   – Izuchuckwu Anthony, Nigerian footballer
  1997   – Filip Forejtek, Czech skier
  1997   – Sarthak Golui, Indian footballer
  1997   – Agustín Guiffrey, Argentinian footballer
  1997   – Michael Kelly, Scottish footballer
  1997   – Takumi Kitamura, Japanese actor 
  1997   – Marco Klepoch, Slovak figure skater
  1997   – Łukasz Kozub, Polish volleyball player
  1997   – Lázaro Martínez, Cuban athlete
1998 – Maddison Elliott, Australian paralympic swimmer
2001 – Hailey Baptiste, American tennis player

Deaths

Pre-1600
 361 – Constantius II, Roman emperor (b. 317)
 753 – Saint Pirmin, Spanish-German monk and saint (b. 700)
1219 – Saer de Quincy, 1st Earl of Winchester, English baron and rebel (b. c. 1170)
1220 – Urraca of Castile, Queen of Portugal, spouse of King Afonso II of Portugal (b. 1186)
1254 – John III Doukas Vatatzes, Byzantine emperor (b. 1193)
1324 – Petronilla de Meath, Irish suspected witch (b. c. 1300)
1373 – Jeanne de Valois, Queen of Navarre (b. 1343)
1428 – Thomas Montacute, 4th Earl of Salisbury, English general and politician (b. 1388)
1456 – Edmund Tudor, 1st Earl of Richmond, father of King Henry VII of England (b. 1431)
1580 – Jerónimo Zurita y Castro, Spanish historian and author (b. 1512)
1584 – Charles Borromeo, Italian cardinal and saint (b. 1538)
1599 – Andrew Báthory, Prince of Transylvania (b. c. 1563)
1600 – Richard Hooker, English priest and theologian (b. 1554)

1601–1900
1639 – Martin de Porres, Peruvian saint (b. 1579)
1643 – John Bainbridge, English astronomer and academic (b. 1582)
  1643   – Paul Guldin, Swiss astronomer and mathematician (b. 1577)
1676 – Köprülü Fazıl Ahmed Pasha, Ottoman soldier and politician, 110th Grand Vizier of the Ottoman Empire (b. 1635)
1711 – John Ernest Grabe, German theologian and academic (b. 1666)
1787 – Robert Lowth, English bishop and academic (b. 1710)
1793 – Olympe de Gouges, French playwright and activist (b. 1748)
1794 – François-Joachim de Pierre de Bernis, French cardinal and diplomat (b. 1715)
1850 – William E. Shannon, Irish-born American politician (b. 1821/1822)
1858 – Harriet Taylor Mill, English philosopher and author (b. 1807)
1869 – Andreas Kalvos, Greek poet and playwright (b. 1792)
1890 – Ulrich Ochsenbein, Swiss lawyer and politician, 1st President of the Swiss National Council (b. 1811)
1891 – Louis Lucien Bonaparte, English-Italian philologist and politician (b. 1813)
1900 – Carrie Steele Logan, American philanthropist, founder of the oldest black orphanage in the United States (b. ~1829)

1901–present
1914 – Georg Trakl, Austrian-Polish pharmacist and poet (b. 1887)
1917 – Léon Bloy, French author and poet (b. 1846)
1918 – Aleksandr Lyapunov, Russian mathematician and physicist (b. 1857)
1926 – Annie Oakley, American entertainer and target shooter (b. 1860)
1927 – Karel Matěj Čapek-Chod, Czech journalist and author (b. 1860)
1929 – Olav Aukrust, Norwegian poet and educator (b. 1883)
1933 – Pierre Paul Émile Roux, French physician, bacteriologist, and immunologist (b. 1853)
1939 – Charles Tournemire, French organist and composer (b. 1870)
1949 – Solomon R. Guggenheim, American art collector and philanthropist, founded the Solomon R. Guggenheim Museum (b. 1861)
1954 – Henri Matisse, French painter and sculptor (b. 1869)
1956 – Jean Metzinger, French artist, (b. 1883)
1957 – Wilhelm Reich, Ukrainian-Austrian psychotherapist and author (b. 1897)
1960 – Paul Willis, American actor and director (b. 1901)
1962 – L. O. Wenckebach, Dutch sculptor and painter (b. 1895)
1968 – Vern Stephens, American baseball player (b. 1920)
1969 – Zeki Rıza Sporel, Turkish footballer (b. 1898)
1973 – Marc Allégret, Swiss-French director and screenwriter (b. 1900)
1975 – Tajuddin Ahmad, Bangladeshi politician, 1st Prime Minister of Bangladesh (b. 1925)
  1975   – Muhammad Mansur Ali, Bangladeshi captain and politician, 3rd Prime Minister of Bangladesh (b. 1919)
  1975   – Syed Nazrul Islam, Bangladeshi lawyer and politician, President of Bangladesh (b. 1925)
  1975   – Abul Hasnat Muhammad Qamaruzzaman, Bangladeshi lawyer and politician (b. 1926)
1980 – Caroline Mytinger, American painter and author (b. 1897)
1983 – Alfredo Antonini, Italian-American conductor and composer (b. 1901)
1983 – Jerry Pentland, Australian fighter ace (b. 1894)
1987 – Mary Shane, American sportscaster and educator (b. 1945)
1988 – Henri van Praag, Dutch philosopher, theologian, and educator (b. 1916)
1989 – Dorothy Fuldheim, American journalist (b. 1893)
1990 – Kenan Erim, Turkish archaeologist and academic (b. 1929)
  1990   – Nusret Fişek, Turkish physician and politician, Turkish Minister of Health (b. 1914)
  1990   – Mary Martin, American actress and singer (b. 1913)
1991 – Chris Bender, American singer (b. 1972)
1993 – Léon Theremin, Russian physicist and engineer, invented the Theremin (b. 1895)
1994 – Valter Palm, Estonian-American boxer (b. 1905)
1995 – Gordon S. Fahrni, Canadian physician (b. 1887)
1996 – Jean-Bédel Bokassa, Central African general and politician, 2nd President of the Central African Republic (b. 1921)
1997 – Ronald Barnes, American carillon player and composer (b. 1927)
1998 – Bob Kane, American author and illustrator, co-created Batman (b. 1915)
1999 – Ian Bannen, Scottish actor (b. 1928)
2001 – Ernst Gombrich, Austrian-English historian and author (b. 1909)
2002 – Lonnie Donegan, Scottish singer-songwriter and guitarist (b. 1931)
  2002   – Jonathan Harris, American actor (b. 1914)
2003 – Rasul Gamzatov, Russian poet and educator (b. 1923)
2004 – Sergejs Žoltoks, Latvian ice hockey player (b. 1972)
2006 – Paul Mauriat, French pianist, composer, and conductor (b. 1925)
  2006   – Marie Rudisill, American author (b. 1911)
  2006   – Alberto Spencer, Ecuadorean footballer (b. 1937)
2007 – Aleksandr Dedyushko, Belarusian-Russian actor (b. 1962)
  2007   – Martin Meehan, PIRA volunteer and Irish republican politician (b. 1945)
  2007   – Ryan Shay, American runner (b. 1979)
2008 – Jean Fournet, French conductor (b. 1913)
2009 – Francisco Ayala, Spanish sociologist, author, and critic (b. 1906)
  2009   – Archie Baird, Scottish footballer, journalist, and educator (b. 1919)
  2009   – Carl Ballantine, American magician and actor (b. 1917)
2010 – Jerry Bock, American composer (b. 1928)
  2010   – Viktor Chernomyrdin, Russian politician and diplomat, 30th Prime Minister of Russia (b. 1938)
  2010   – Jim Clench, Canadian bass player (b. 1949)
2011 – Peeter Kreitzberg, Estonian lawyer and politician (b. 1948)
2012 – Carmélia Alves, Brazilian singer (b. 1923)
  2012   – George Chesterton, English cricketer and coach (b. 1922)
  2012   – Tommy Godwin, American-English cyclist and coach (b. 1920)
  2012   – Mükerrem Hiç, Turkish academic, author, and politician (b. 1929)
  2012   – Thomas K. McCraw, American historian and academic (b. 1940)
  2012   – Kailashpati Mishra, Indian activist and politician, 18th Governor of Gujarat (b. 1923)
2013 – Nick Cardy, American soldier and illustrator (b. 1920)
  2013   – Gerard Cieślik, Polish footballer and manager (b. 1927)
  2013   – Gamani Corea, Sri Lankan economist and diplomat (b. 1925)
  2013   – William J. Coyne, American lawyer and politician (b. 1936)
  2013   – Rupert Gerritsen, Australian historian and author (b. 1953)
  2013   – Leonard Long, Australian painter and educator (b. 1911)
2014 – Augusto Martelli, Italian composer and conductor (b. 1940)
  2014   – Gordon Tullock, American economist and academic (b. 1922)
  2014   – Sadashiv Amrapurkar, Indian actor (b. 1950)
2015 – Ahmed Chalabi, Iraqi businessman and politician (b. 1944)
  2015   – Howard Coble, American captain, lawyer, and politician (b. 1931)
  2015   – Tom Graveney, English cricketer and sportscaster (b. 1927)
  2015   – Lauretta Ngcobo, South African novelist and essayist (b. 1931)
2016 – Kay Starr, American singer (b. 1922)
2018 – Sondra Locke, American actress and director (b. 1944)

Holidays and observances
 Christian feast day:
Acepsimas of Hnaita and companions (Greek Orthodox Church)
Clydog
Cristiolus
Elias I of Antioch (Syriac Orthodox Church)
Ermengol (Hermengaudius)
Gaudiosus of Tarazona
Gwenhael
Hubertus
Libertine
Malachy O' More
Blessed Manuel Lozano Garrido
Martin de Porres
Papulus
Pirmin
Richard Hooker (Anglican Communion)
Rumwold of Buckingham
 Blessed Rupert Mayer
Silvia
Winifred
November 3 (Eastern Orthodox liturgics)
Culture Day (Japan)
Flag Day (United Arab Emirates)
Independence Day / Separation Day, celebrates the separation and independence of Panama from Colombia in 1903.
Independence Day, celebrates the independence of Dominica from the United Kingdom in 1978.
Independence Day, celebrates the independence of the Federated States of Micronesia from the United States in 1986.
Independence Day of Cuenca (Ecuador)
Mother's Day (East Timor)
Victory Day (Maldives)

References

External links

 
 
 

Days of the year
November